Rafael Domínguez Gamas (Cárdenas, Tabasco, February 14, 1883 -Veracruz, Veracruz, January 23, 1959) was a Mexican academic, journalist, lawyer and writer. He was a member of Academia Mexicana de la Lengua.

He studied laws at the Instituto Juárez, where he was also a professor. He also managed schools in several towns in Tabasco. He published in the journals Alba, El Renacimiento and El Eco de Tabasco. In 1914, he moved to Veracruz, where he worked for the journal El Dictamen.

Works
Un recuerdo de Solferino
Añoranzas del Instituto Juárez
Azul como tus ojos: cuentos y pasatiempos literarios, 1925.
Veracruz en el ensueño y el recuerdo: apuntes de la vida jarocha, 1946.
Páginas sueltas: entretenimientos literarios, 1946.
Diccionario general de gentilicios, 1948.
Tierra mía, 1949.
El ideal de servir, 1957.
Ensayos críticos de lenguaje

References 

1883 births
1959 deaths
20th-century Mexican writers
20th-century Mexican male writers
Writers from Tabasco
People from Cárdenas, Tabasco
Mexican journalists
Male journalists
Members of the Mexican Academy of Language
20th-century Mexican lawyers
20th-century journalists